Be Still My Soul is the debut album of Selah, released in 1999.

The album consists of modern arrangements of traditional Christian hymns. The first track starts out with a Kituba translation of Pass Me Not, O Gentle Savior, a language singers and siblings Nicol and Todd Smith know because of a missionary upbringing in Subsaharan Africa. The band says that because they were on a very small budget for the album, they were forced to keep it simple, which explains the strong emphasis on vocals with piano.

Reception and awards 
CCM Magazine described it to be "a beautiful and moving music experience. While the production is sparse (piano and strings with occasional guitar and percussion), the performances are at once dynamic and soulful." Steve Huey of Allmusic notes the "slight African sensibilities" in "the gospel stylings of Selah". Allmusic gave it a rating of 3 out of 5 stars.

The album won the Inspirational Album of the Year Dove Award in 2000.

Chart positions

Track listing

References 

1999 debut albums
Curb Records albums
Selah (band) albums